Fir Creek is a tributary, about  long, of the Bull Run River in the U.S. state of Oregon. Part of the system that provides drinking water to the city of Portland, it flows generally northwest through a protected part of the Mount Hood National Forest in Clackamas and Multnomah counties.

Course
The creek arises in the Mount Hood National Forest in northern Clackamas County near its border with Multnomah County. The stream flows north, crossing the border almost immediately and entering Multnomah County. Turning west, it receives an unnamed tributary from the right before turning gradually northwest. It passes under Forest Road 1211 and by a United States Geological Survey (USGS) stream gauge  from the mouth.

Discharge
Since 1975 the USGS has monitored the flow of Fir Creek at a stream gauge  from the mouth.

Watershed
The Bull Run River watershed, which includes Fir Creek, drains . The basin, which is the main source of Portland's drinking water, is largely restricted to uses related to water collection, storage, treatment, and forest management. The Fir Creek basin of about  amounts to about 4 percent of the total Bull Run River watershed, which is managed by the Portland Water Bureau and the United States Forest Service.

See also
List of rivers of Oregon
Bull Run National Forest

References

Works cited
Portland Water Bureau (2007). "Landscape Conditions", Chapter 4 of Current Habitat Conditions in the  Habitat Conservation Plan Area. Portland, Oregon: Portland Water Bureau. Retrieved March 9, 2010.

External links
Sandy River Basin Watershed Council
Sandy River Basin Partners
Forest Service, Mount Hood National Forest

Rivers of Oregon
Rivers of Clackamas County, Oregon
Rivers of Multnomah County, Oregon
Mount Hood National Forest